Race, RACE or The Race may refer to:

 Race (biology), an informal taxonomic classification within a species, generally within a sub-species
 Race (human categorization), classification of humans into groups based on physical traits, and/or social relations
 Racing, a competition of speed

Rapid movement
 The Race (yachting race)
 Mill race, millrace, or millrun, the current of water that turns a water wheel, or the channel (sluice) conducting water to or from a water wheel
 Tidal race, a fast-moving tide passing through a constriction

Acronyms
 RACE encoding, a syntax for encoding non-ASCII characters in ASCII
 Radio Amateur Civil Emergency Service, in the US, established in 1952 for wartime use
 Rapid amplification of cDNA ends, a technique in molecular biology
 RACE (Remote Applications in Challenging Environments), a robotics development center in the UK
 RACE Racing Academy and Centre of Education, a jockey and horse-racing industry training centre in Kildare town in the Republic of Ireland
 RACE (automobile association), an automobile association in Spain
 RACE (container) or Railways of Australia Container Express, a slightly wider version of the standard ISO shipping container
 Royal Automobile Club of Spain

Arts, entertainment, and media

Books
 Race (fantasy), classification of fictional species in the fantasy genre
 Race (play), a 2009 play by David Mamet
 The Race (Patterson novel), a 2007 novel by Richard North Patterson
 The Race (Allan novel), a 2014 novel by Nina Allan
 The Race, a 2011 novel by Clive Cussler
 The Race (Worldwar), fictional alien invaders in the works of Harry Turtledove
 Colonel Race, an Agatha Christie character

Film
 Race film, early films produced for an all-black audience
 Race (film series)
 Race (2008 film), a Bollywood thriller
 Race 2, a 2013 Bollywood action-thriller film sequel to the 2008 film
 Race 3, a 2018 Bollywood action-thriller film sequel to Race 2
 The Race (1916 film), a silent film directed by George Melford
 The Race (2002 film) (Le raid), a French film starring Josiane Balasko
 Race (2007 film), an animated sci-fi film
 The Race, a 2009 film starring Colm Meaney
 Race (2011 film), a Malayalam thriller
 Race (2013 film), a Telugu film
 Race (2016 film), a film about African American athlete Jesse Owens
 Melting Pot (film), also known as Race, a 1998 feature film

Television
 The Amazing Race, a US reality television game show franchise
 The Race (TV series), a 2006 UK reality programme
 "The Race" (Joe 90)
 "The Race" (Seinfeld)
 "The Race" (The Goodies)
 Race Bannon, a character in Jonny Quest

Games
 Race – The Official WTCC Game (2006), a computer game
 Race for the Galaxy (2007), a card game

Music
 The Race (band), a UK indie rock band
 Race (album), a 1988 album by Pseudo Echo

Songs
 "The Race" (Tay-K song)
 "The Race" (Wiz Khalifa song)
 "The Race" (Yello song)
 "The Race", a song by 30 Seconds To Mars from LOVE LUST FAITH + DREAMS
 "The Race", a song by Cajun Dance Party from The Colourful Life
 "The Race", an unreleased song by Coldplay
 "Race", a song by Tiger
 "Race", a song by Prince from Come

Other uses
 Race (bearing), a part of a mechanical device
 Race (surname)
 Race condition, a computer programming error
 Race Street station, a light rail station in San Jose, California
 Space Race, the competition between the United States and the Soviet Union for dominance in spaceflight capability
 Race, alternative term for an election, especially in the US

See also

 Raceland (disambiguation)